Nathan King may refer to:

 Nathan King (curler) (born 1999), Canadian curler
 Nathan King (musician) (born 1970), English musician
 Nathan King (singer-songwriter) (born 1978), New Zealand singer-songwriter
 Nathan King, paternal great-grandfather of African-American civil rights activist Martin Luther King Jr.